The National Institute of Renewable Natural Resources and Environment, also known as INDERENA, was a Colombian environmental government agency established in 1968 to implement environmental policy and promote green development in Colombia. INDERENA was successful in helping create the environment in government and the acceptance in society to move environmental protection into the national agenda, this led to the creation of child agencies like the National Natural Parks System, and the eventual evolution into the Ministry of Environment in 1993.

See also
 Germán García Durán

References

Government agencies established in 1968
Government agencies disestablished in 1993
Ministry of Environment and Sustainable Development (Colombia)
Defunct government agencies of Colombia